Saint Lucia competed at the 2010 Summer Youth Olympics, the inaugural Youth Olympic Games, held in Singapore from 14 August to 26 August 2010.

Athletics

Boys
Track and road events

Boxing

Boys

Sailing

One Person Dinghy

Swimming

References

External links
Competitors List: Saint Lucia – Singapore 2010 official site

Pan
Nations at the 2010 Summer Youth Olympics
Saint Lucia at the Youth Olympics